The Men's super-G competition at the FIS Alpine World Ski Championships 2023 was held at L'Éclipse ski course in Courchevel on 9 February 2023.

Results
The race was started at 11:30 CET.

References

Men's super-G